Baskeleh-ye Cheshmeh Sefid (also Romanized as Bāskeleh-ye Cheshmeh Sefīd; also known as Cheshmeh Sefīd) is a village in Gowavar Rural District, Govar District, Gilan-e Gharb County, Kermanshah Province, Iran. At the 2006 census, its population was 215, in 45 families.

References 

Populated places in Gilan-e Gharb County